Bruno Nuytten (born 28 August 1945) is a French cinematographer turned director.

Camille Claudel which was Nuytten's first directorial and screenwriting effort, won the César Award for Best film in 1989. The film starred and was co-produced by Isabelle Adjani, with whom he had a son, Barnabé Saïd-Nuytten. Adjani won the Silver Bear for Best Actress at the 39th Berlin International Film Festival for her role in the film.

His sophomore directorial effort, Albert Souffre, though also a heavily emotional movie, was set in contemporary times.

His 2000 film, Passionnément, starred Charlotte Gainsbourg.
 
His films as cinematographer include Les Valseuses, Barocco, La meilleure façon de marcher, The Bronte Sisters, Brubaker, Garde à vue, Possession, Fort Saganne, So Long, Stooge (Tchao Pantin), Jean de Florette and Manon des Sources (US title: Manon of the Spring). He won the César Award for Best Cinematography in 1977 and 1984, and was nominated in 1980, 1982, 1985 and 1987.

He is a professor at France's national film school La Fémis.

Biography

In his adolescence, Bruno Nuytten played in an amateur theater troupe. His education is varied: training for Art Deco competitions, training for the IDHEC competition, and unfinished training at the Institut national supérieur des arts du spectacle et des techniques de diffusion (INSAS, Belgium, 1967-1969), then obtaining a BTS in "prises de vues" or "shooting" in Paris. He began by being assistant to Ghislain Cloquet (who had been his professor at INSAS), then to Claude Lecomte and to Ricardo Aronovitch. He first worked on short films, then launched himself into the roles of cinematographer and director of photography. He seeks contrasting images, a moving camera, an active relationship with space. By listening to the directors, he learned how to use fixed shots and lighting without contrast when requested by Marguerite Duras (La Femme du Gange (1974), India Song (1975), Son nom de Venise (1976)), or an exaggeratedly expressionist style and a shoulder camera with Andrzej Zulawski (Possession, 1981).

Bruno Nuytten went into directing for Camille Claudel, at the express request of actress Isabelle Adjani, who co-produced the film (with Christian Fechner) and took the leading role. In 2013, she says: “His reason to be, it was the shadow. From the shadow, he made the light exist. He had told me that he would never go into directing. [...] I told him that I would like to use the body of Camille Claudel to be able to personify my own disarray, my cry. He heard me.” A few years earlier, Nuytten had remarked: “The only interesting thing that I discovered while talking with a journalist is that in fact I had put myself in scene in the inversion of powers: at the end of the film I had become Camille Claudel and Isabelle Adjani had become Rodin. And there I am more and more Camille Claudel, even if I am not still in the asylum! One never escapes the delicate, fragile, and human things one touches…”

In 2015, Caroline Champetier, also director of photography, devoted the documentary Nuytten/Film to him.

Bruno Nuytten wrote articles for the technical review Le cinema pratique, animated conferences at the Ciné-club de Melun, and lectures at the Université de Paris III. In Switzerland he founded a production company for advertising films.

Bruno Nuytten was the companion of Isabelle Adjani with whom he had a son, Barnabé, in 1979. Since 1996, he has lived with the director Tatiana Vialle, with whom he has had two children, Tobias and Galathée.

Filmography

As a director 
 1988: Camille Claudel
 1992: Albert Souffre
 2000: Passionnément
 2002: Jim, la nuit

As a cinematographer 
 1969: L'Espace vital by Patrice Leconte - short film
 1971: Les Machins de l'existence by Jean-François Dion - short film
 1971: La Poule de Luc Béraud - short film
 1972: Tristan et Iseult by Yvan Lagrange
 1974: Les Valseuses by Bertrand Blier
 1974: Le Jeu des preuves by Luc Béraud - short film
 1974: La Femme du Gange by Marguerite Duras
 1975: India Song by Marguerite Duras
 1975: Souvenirs d'en France by André Téchiné
 1976: Les Vécés étaient fermés de l'intérieur by Patrice Leconte
 1976: La meilleure façon de marcher by Claude Miller
 1976: L'Assassin musicien by Benoît Jacquot
 1976: Mon cœur est rouge by Michèle Rosier
 1976: Barocco by André Téchiné
 1976: Son nom de Venise dans Calcutta désert by Marguerite Duras
 1977: Le Camion by Marguerite Duras
 1977: La Nuit, tous les chats sont gris by Gérard Zingg
 1978: L'Exercice du pouvoir by Philippe Galland
 1978: La Tortue sur le dos by Luc Béraud
 1979: Les Sœurs Brontë by André Téchiné
 1979: Zoo zéro by Alain Fleischer
 1979: French Postcards by Willard Huyck
 1980: Brubaker by Stuart Rosenberg
 1981: Hôtel des Amériques by André Téchiné
 1981: Garde à vue by Claude Miller
 1981: Possession by Andrzej Żuławski
 1981:  by Michel Vianey
 1982: Invitation au voyage by Peter del Monte
 1983: Tchao pantin by Claude Berri
 1983: La Pirate by Jacques Doillon
 1983: La vie est un roman by Alain Resnais
 1984: Fort Saganne by Alain Corneau
 1985: Les Enfants by Marguerite Duras
 1985: Détective by Jean-Luc Godard
 1986: Jean de Florette by Claude Berri 
 1986: Manon des sources by Claude Berri

References

External links 

1945 births
Living people
Best Cinematography BAFTA Award winners
César Award winners
French cinematographers
French film directors
People from Melun